C-Road is a census-designated place (CDP) in Plumas County, California, United States. The population was 150 at the 2010 census, down from 152 at the 2000 census.

Geography
C-Road is located at  (39.759419, -120.583560).

Demographics

2010
The 2010 United States Census reported that C-Road had a population of 150. The racial makeup of C-Road was 140 (93.3%) White, 0 (0.0%) African American, 0 (0.0%) Native American, 2 (1.3%) Asian, 0 (0.0%) Pacific Islander, 0 (0.0%) from other races, and 8 (5.3%) from two or more races. Hispanic or Latino of any race were 9 persons (6.0%).

The Census reported that 150 people (100% of the population) lived in households, 0 (0%) lived in non-institutionalized group quarters, and 0 (0%) were institutionalized.

There were 73 households, out of which 11 (15.1%) had children under the age of 18 living in them, 49 (67.1%) were opposite-sex married couples living together, 3 (4.1%) had a female householder with no husband present, 2 (2.7%) had a male householder with no wife present.  There were 2 (2.7%) unmarried opposite-sex partnerships, and 1 (1.4%) same-sex married couples or partnerships. 17 households (23.3%) were made up of individuals, and 4 (5.5%) had someone living alone who was 65 years of age or older. The average household size was 2.05.  There were 54 families (74.0% of all households); the average family size was 2.37.

The population was spread out, with 17 people (11.3%) under the age of 18, 6 people (4.0%) aged 18 to 24, 25 people (16.7%) aged 25 to 44, 73 people (48.7%) aged 45 to 64, and 29 people (19.3%) who were 65 years of age or older.  The median age was 53.3 years. For every 100 females, there were 117.4 males.  For every 100 females age 18 and over, there were 111.1 males.

The homeowner vacancy rate was 3.0%; the rental vacancy rate was 0%.  131 people (87.3% of the population) lived in owner-occupied housing units and 19 people (12.7%) lived in rental housing units.

2000
As of the census of 2000, there were 152 people, 61 households, and 50 families residing in the CDP. The racial makeup of the CDP was 94.08% White, 2.63% Black or African American, 0.66% Native American, 1.97% Asian, and 0.66% from two or more races. 1.32% of the population were Hispanic or Latino of any race.

There were 61 households, out of which 31.1% had children under the age of 18 living with them, 67.2% were married couples living together, 4.9% had a female householder with no husband present, and 18.0% were non-families. 16.4% of all households were made up of individuals, and 4.9% had someone living alone who was 65 years of age or older. The average household size was 2.49 and the average family size was 2.80.

In the CDP, the population was spread out, with 23.0% under the age of 18, 3.3% from 18 to 24, 22.4% from 25 to 44, 39.5% from 45 to 64, and 11.8% who were 65 years of age or older. The median age was 46 years. For every 100 females, there were 130.3 males. For every 100 females age 18 and over, there were 129.4 males.

The median income for a household in the CDP was $26,250, and the median income for a family was $51,250. Males had a median income of $51,250 versus $0 for females. The per capita income for the CDP was $18,088. About 27.1% of families and 33.8% of the population were below the poverty line, including 66.7% of those under the age of eighteen and 66.7% of those 65 or over.

Politics

References

Census-designated places in Plumas County, California
Census-designated places in California